The Thermphos International B.V. was a venture of the chemical industry, which produced phosphorus and inorganic phosphorus compounds. In 2005 it earned about 550 Million Euros and employed about 1200 people. It was Europe's only producer of elemental phosphorus. The company was also involved in recycling phosphorus. It used to be a former affiliate of the German chemicals company Hoechst AG and was taken over in 2003 by a group of private investors, led by the Italian-Israeli businessman Nahum Galmor.

Sites
The headquarters of the venture was in Vlissingen (in the Netherlands), with supporting production centres in Europe, Asia, and South America.

In North America, the company operates a sales center in Anniston, Alabama and Mattawan, Canada.

Worldwide, the company has 16 daughter corporations:
 Thermphos International BV, Netherlands
 Thermphos Deutschland GmbH, Germany
 Thermphos France S.A.R.L., France
 Thermphos UK Ltd., Great Britain
 Thermphos Food Additive Co. Ltd., China
 Sudamfos S.A., Argentina
 Omnisal GmbH, Germany
 Thermphos Trading GmbH, Switzerland
 Thermphos Dequest AG, Switzerland
 Thermphos Dequest UK Ltd., Great Britain
 Thermphos België BVBA, Belgium
 Thermphos Investments Singapore Pte. Ltd, Singapore
 Thermphos Japan Ltd., Japan
 Thermphos USA Corp., United States
 Sudamfos Comercio de Produtos Quimicos do Brasil Ltda., Brazil
 Industrial Park Vlissingen, Netherlands

Products
Thermphos products center around phosphorus and phosphates. This ranges from elemental phosphorus to base chemicals of phosphate chemistry, such as phosphoric Acid and polyphosphoric acid, phosphorus trichloride, phosphorus oxychloride, phosphorus pentachloride, phosphorus pentoxide, phosphorus pentasulfide, aluminium phosphate, calcium phosphate, ammonium phosphate, potassium phosphate, and sodium phosphate, as well as other additives for plastics and ceramics as well as food industries. Phosphorus is one of the three main nutrients present in fertilizer.

Environmental issues
In September 2010 the Public Health authorities of The Netherlands (VROM) issued an ultimatum on the Thermphos Industrial Park Vlissingen because of enduring severe environmental and safety problems related to emission of and exposure to cadmium and dioxine. If these problems were not solved quickly, VROM said, the factory must be closed.

Bankruptcy
On November 21, 2012, the district court of Breda declared the company bankrupt.

References

External links
 Official Homepage, archived April 2013

Chemical companies of the Netherlands
Vlissingen
Companies based in Zeeland